is a Japanese biophysicist. His research interest only focus on two proteins: the Ca2+-ATPase of muscle sarcoplasmic reticulum, and the Na+, K+-ATPase expressed in all animal cells. He is a professor of University of Tokyo and the Foreign Associate of the National Academy of Sciences, USA. Toyoshima's research about the Ca2+-ATPase started in 1989. In the next few years, he and his colleagues obtained a series of images of Ca2+-ATPase at the revolution of Atomic-level in the world for the first time. By the x-ray crystallography, cryo-EM and other methods, he has determined the crystal structures of ten intermediates of Ca2+-ATPase. On September 10, 2015, The Royal Swedish Academy of Sciences awarded him and Poul Nissen the Gregori Aminoff Prize of 2016 for their fundamental contributions to understanding the structural basis for ATP-driven translocation of ions across membrane.

Early life and education

Toyoshima was born in a small town of Honjo, in the prefecture of Akita, Japan. The elementary-school education in Honjo is enthusiastic in developing children's ability in science, writing, sports, and arts. He and his old brother worked on science experiments with his mother, a high school economic home teacher. They did quite well in science research contests throughout Akita. He also showed an early flair for crafty innovation. He spent his free time on constructing plastic and wooden models of planes and ships. And when he was older, toy electronics became his pastime. The experience and success in science during his youth help him a lot when he stepped into a highly technical field, he recalled after a few decades. But the immediate effect at that time was that he considered being a doctor when he first feared the career decision. At last, he quit. Since his old brother had pursued medicine in college, he thought it was not necessary to have two medical doctors in the family. So he decided to choose another branch of science instead of literature even though he performed well in modern Japanese that his high school teacher suggested he study literature and writing in college. He finally chose Physics, a fashionable choice at that time and an easier choice than literature for him.

In 1973, he was admitted by University of Tokyo on his first trial. He soon considered diligently the possibility to survive in that rigorous environment. In the first two-year, he studied standard physics but also took classes in the biochemistry and botany departments. In the middle of the third year, a visit to Setsuro Ebashi's laboratory appealed him by the description of the Electron microscope work. He decided to carry out a small project in Ebashi's laboratory, where he continued to work on microscopy of muscle thin filaments and myosin heads for his master's and doctoral research when finished his undergraduate degree in 1978. He completed his PhD in 1983.

Career

In 1984, Toyoshima became a research associate in University of Tokyo after he got PhD degree. Two years later, he took a postdoctoral position at the Laboratory of biophysicist Nigel Unwin in Stanford University. In Unwin's group, Toyoshima worked to develop mathematical methods for disentangling the superimposed information from a projection image, or electron micrograph, of the tubular structure. In 1988, he followed Unwin went to the Medical Research Council, Laboratory of Molecular Biology, where he met another biophysicist David Stokes, who was studying Ca2+-ATPase. He also worked with Stokes. After moving back to Japan in 1989, he joined in the Frontier Research Program at RIKEN as a research scientist. One year later, he moved to the Tokyo Institute of Technology as an associate professor in 1990. In 1994, Toyoshima was offered a faculty position at University of Tokyo, where he is currently professor of Center for Structural Biology of Challenging Proteins, Institute of Molecular and Cellular Biosciences.

Research
During the early research life of Toyoshima, he worked on "3D image analysis of muscle thin filaments decorated by myosin heads" as an electron microscopist in the Department of Physics, University of Tokyo. Then he turned to the acetylcholine receptor research after he went to Unwin's laboratory to study the cryo-EM in 1986. By developing a new mathematics algorithm to untangle the superimposed images obtained from the cryo-EM, he managed to reconstruct the 3D structure of ion channel at 17 Å resolution. This is the first one 3D structure of the ion channel. It was greeted with great excitement. Soon afterwards, the same way was applied to reconstruct the 3D structure of Ca2+-ATPase with the cooperation from David Stokes. They published their analysis of the structure of this protein in Nature in 1993. After backing to Japan, Toyoshima's later research continued to focus on the structure of Ca2+-ATPase. Through combining the x-ray crystallography and the crystallization method for EM, Toyoshima obtained large enough crystals of Ca2+-ATPase in the first state, the E1·2Ca2+. Then he published it in 2000, which caused a lot of excitement at that time because it was world-first for the crystal structure of P-type ATPases at such a high revolution(2.6 Å). Over the years that followed, he published a series of crystal structure of Ca2+-ATPase in succession. Until now, he has determined crystal structures of this ATPase in ten different states by x-ray crystallography, covering roughly the entire reaction cycle. He also extended his research to Na+, K+-ATPase and developed a methodology for electron crystallography of ultrathin 3D protein crystals. Nowadays, he still aims at the calcium ion pump just as the direction of the footprints which he stepped on this road of adventure in the past 27 years.

Award

Asahi Prize, Asahi Shimbun (2009)
Yamazaki-Teiichi Prize (2011)
Medal with Purple Ribbon (2015)
Uehara Prize，The Uehara Memorial Foundation (2015)
Gregori Aminoff Prize, The Royal Swedish Academy of Sciences (2016)

References

External links
 Toyoshima Lab
 research map of Prof Toyoshima

1954 births
Living people
Japanese biophysicists
University of Tokyo alumni
Academic staff of the University of Tokyo
People from Akita Prefecture
Foreign associates of the National Academy of Sciences